Stoneykirk is an area and a village in the heart of the Rhins of Galloway, Wigtownshire, in the administrative council area of Dumfries and Galloway, Scotland nearly ten miles in length and three and a half miles in breadth, bounded on the east by the bay of Luce, and on the west by the Irish Channel,  south of Stranraer.

The area is about 21,500 acres, of which 19,000 are arable, 375 woodland and plantations, and the remainder, whereof 1,100 might be reclaimed, moorland.

Stoneykirk has a community council 

Knockinaam Lodge, Port Spittal, Stoneykirk, because of its remoteness was the location for a secret meeting between Sir Winston Churchill and General Eisenhower during the Second World War to discuss the D-Day plans.

The A716 runs through part of the village, and a local coach firm, McCulloch's Coaches, is based in the village

James King 407 Service provides a bus link north to Stranraer and south to Sandhead and Drummore

Sandhead overlooks Luce Bay that was used for landing lime and coal.

The Village
Stoneykirk village, located near the RAF West Freugh, developed around the church (now disused) and was named after the church.

The Village Hall is headquarters of the South Rhins Community Development Trust

The village school is situated above the village.

It has two hotels, the 3 star Torrs Warren Country House Hotel, and the original manse built in 1790 with a restaurant and bar.

Stoneykirk Church
The first church, Saint Stephen's Kirk or Steeniekirk or Stephenskirk or Stevenskirk or Stainiekirk or Staneykirk or Stanykirk or Toskarton or Toskartoun or Toscartoun or Toscarton or Achawan or Auchwane or Achowane or Clayshant, and finally Stoneykirk, was dedicated to St. Stephen and is thought to have been built between the 12th and 14th centuries, possibly under the patronage of the McCulloch family of Ardwell, Toskarton Parish. Clan McCulloch  

Toskarton and Clayshant ancient parishes were united to Stoneykirk in AD1618.

In 1827 the old medieval parish church was rebuilt.

Stoneykirk Free Church building was erected in 1844 and it passed successively to the United Free Church and the Church of Scotland, and united with Ardwell-Sandhead as Stoneykirk in 1974.

Kirkmadrine Church
Kirkmadryne was dedicated to St. Medran, an early bishop of Ossory.  There were three chapels of ease in the parish: St. Brioch's at Kirkmabreck, St. Donan's at Kildonan, and St. Lashrean's at Killaser.  The building is no longer used as a church.

The Monogram Stones of Kirkmadrine date from about AD450, which makes them the earliest inscribed Christian gravestones in Scotland and the oldest Christian monuments in Scotland outside Whithorn.   The oldest is a pillar stone dating from the 5th Century. All the stones were found in the immediate vicinity, suggesting that it was an early Christian cemetery.   See Clachanmore.

History
A cornerstone of McDowell's Garthland Castle (Tower House) bore the date AD1211, and on another towards the east, AD1274.

In AD1295 Sir Dougal MacDougall (McDowell) had a Charter from his 3rd cousin, King John Baliol Lord of Galloway, confirming the Barony of Garochloyne with Lougan and Elrig in the Rhinns of Galloway.

Janet McDowell (McDowall), daughter of Uchtred McDowell of Garthland, married Ninian Adair, son of William Adair of Dunskey Castle and of Kilhilt who was killed at Battle of Flodden.  Uchtred McDowell, who was also killed at Battle of Flodden, appeared to own the area of Stranraer, and Ninian & Janet McDowell built the Castle of St. John, Stranraer, possibly on her father's Stranraer land. On 27 Feb 1547, in book "Inquisitiones Speciales", under "Wigton", Uthredus M'Douell was heir to his father Joannis M'Douell de Garthland who was killed at the Battle of Pinkie Cleugh (qui obit apud Pinkiecleuch), of 24 merkland of Garthland, Parish Stoneykirk, and 14 merkland of Lochans (adjoining Garthland) in Parish of Inche. On Ainslie's AD1782 map, William McDowall Esq. was shown at Garthland Castle.  Killhilt, the ancient home of the Adair family, is also shown on the 1782 map just north of, and adjoining  McDowell's Garthland Castle.

In Wigtownshire, the name McCulloch Clan McCulloch appears on very early documents, i.e. Register of the Great Seal of Scotland. vol. I, appendix II. p. 531, nos. 321, 322, Kirkmadrine, Tuskercon / Toskerton / Toskertoun,Toskertoune.

About AD1317 King Robert the Bruce I of Scotland (reigned 1306–29) knighted Captain Cullo og Neil (o’Neil) and chose him to be his standard-bearer and Secretary of
State.   King Robert the Bruce I granted Sir Cullo og Neil lands  and Achawan or  Auchwane in Wigtownshire (also known as Kirkmadren, ref. RMS vol VIII, p. 87, #255, Toskartoun, Toscartoun, and Staneykirk, Stoneykirk ), which encompassed the estates and castles of Ardwell and Killasser) near Clachanmore (Low Ardwell). The 42 merkland of Toskerton had been forfeited by Sir John le Mareschal de Toskerton to King Robert I.  In 1331 Sir Cullo Og Neil died and left his estate to his eldest son Sir Godfrey, who assumed the surname of McCullog. (McCullough / McCullo’c).

Barony of Achowane & Baronia Killasser  On 7 July 1618 William McCulloch of Mertoun (Myretoun McCulloch Torhous in Mochrum Parish), with the consent of his eldest son Alexander, ratified a charter of Killasser in the barony of Achowane to William Houston and his wife Katherine Vaus.    The subscript mentioned a new deed of baronia Killasser and the castle.  Another deed of 29 June 1621, was from William Houston to  William Adair, whereby James Glover, Notary Public, recorded delivery of seizin (sasine) of 4 merk land of Carnewell ( Cairnweil ), next to Kirkmadrin Church, in the Parish of Toscartoun.

Killasser Castle is shown on Ainslie's 1782 map as in ruins.  It was the ancient seat of the Macculloch of Ardwell.

The Parish List of Wigtownshire AD1684, pp. 57–61, lists the places in Stonykirk Civil Parish.

Adjoining Killasser Castle was William Maxwell of Ardwell at Ardwell House, Stoneykirk Parish, Wigtownshire.

There was a Lord Maxwell who was imprisoned by James VI and released as long as he quit Scotland. In AD1588 Lord Maxwell was in Spain when the Armada was being prepared, and advised Philip that the Galloway ports should be used.  The First-class Man of War "Philip & Mary" embedded on shingle not far from Port William, Parish of Mochrum near Sir William Maxwell's Myretoun Castle on the Monreith Estate.

Archaeology

In Archaeological and Historical Collections relating to Ayrshire and Galloway. vol.V. p. 63, Rev. George Wilson lists forts in Stoneykirk - (a)One north of Drumbreddan Bay, not on O.S. map.  (b) Doon Castle at Ardwell Point.  (c) Kirlauchline, 5 miles north of Ardwell Point.  (d) Kildonan, a double fort.  (e) Knockdoon, the name indicates a fort north of Awhirk.    Also Cairns at Doon Hill of Kildrochet.

(b) Doon Castle, near High Ardwell are the remains of the best example of an Iron Age broch in Dumfries and Galloway.

(c) Kirlauchline Promontory Fort, Camp Bay south.

1) East Galdenoch fort (scheduled ancient monument) between East Galdenoch and Freugh airfield. A circular fort with a diam. of 110m. of later prehistoric date.

2) East Galdenoch settlement (scheduled ancient monument) 100m southeast of East Galdenoch.  A prehistoric palisade settlement 120m long by 60m.

3) East Galdenoch settlement (scheduled ancient monument) 450m northeast of East Galdenoch.  A prehistoric settlement 260m by 250m.

There are Promontory Forts either side of Float Bay 

Dunaldboys Mote south Knockinaam, Iron Age promontory fort on the head of sea cliffs. There is also a standing stone by the side of the Portpatrick-Cairngarroch road.

Balgreggan Motte, Sandhead,  stands above the A716. The Motte was the first in a line of early castles along the eastern shore of the Rhins.  A 1782 map shows Balgreggan House of Hon. Sir Frederick Maitland.

Farm of Port Spittal, Stoneykirk, 2 miles south of Portpatrick. "Burial ground of the four Kings". A Bronze Age Cist and Urn were found in a grave covered with a whinstone slab.
The bones can be seen in the Stranraer Museum.

Great Spanish Armada   In AD1588 some vessels belonging to the Great Spanish Armada were wrecked off the western coast, not far from a bay which in commemoration of that circumstance, was named the bay of Float.   At Money Point (Money Head)  a considerable number of Spanish dubloons were subsequently discovered.  See Spanish Armada in Ireland in AD1588, and Spanish Armada wrecks on the western coast of Scotland in the Calendar of State Papers  Project Adair at 

However, in the book "The Scotch Irish" by Charles A. Hanna, p. 233, it states that in the parish at Stoneykirk are the farms and bay of Float, locally stated to have been so called from the wreck of one of the ships of the Spanish Armada ; and the headland close to, corrupted from the Gaelic word "monadh", the hill-head, to " Moneyhead," from money supposed to have been lost from the wreck. The name Float is from the Norse "flott", which means a plain.

List of Listed Buildings
List of listed buildings in Stoneykirk, Dumfries and Galloway

Gallery.  western-shore of the Rhins & Mid-Rhins, Stoneykirk

Gallery. eastern-shore of the Rhins, Stoneykirk

References 

Wigtownshire
Ports and harbours of Scotland
Villages in Dumfries and Galloway
Parishes in Dumfries and Galloway
Places in the Rhins